Tú y las nubes ("You and the Clouds") is a 1955 Mexican film. It stars Carlos Orellana.

Cast
 Miguel Aceves Mejía
 Carlos Bravo y Fernández
 Florencio Castelló
 José Chávez		
 Vargas de Tecalitrán ...	mariachi
 Carmen Flores
 Lola Flores
 Enrique García Álvarez
 Elmo Michel
 Carlos Orellana		
 Antonio Padilla 'Pícoro'
 Raúl Ramírez
 Fernando Soto

External links
 

1955 films
1950s Spanish-language films
Mexican musical comedy films
1950s musical comedy films
Mexican black-and-white films
1950s Mexican films